HSwMS Helsingborg (K32)  is a Swedish . She was ordered by the Swedish Government in 1995 and is the second ship of the class built by Kockums. She has been in active service with the 31st Corvette Squadron, 3rd Naval Warfare Flotilla since 19 December 2009. It is a stealth missile corvette.

Design and description 

HSwMS Helsingborg is the second ship of the s. It was built by Kockums at the Karlskrona naval base, and was the first of four vessels of the class which are designed for coastal warfare.

The hull of the vessel is made of carbon fiber reinforced plastic, a stealth technology, in order to make the vessel difficult to detect by other forces. A minimum of external equipment is stored outside of the vessel, with equipment such as liferafts being stored inside the hull. This hull also reduces the weight of the vessel by around half. It was intended to be radar silent until it moves within  of an enemy vessel, resulting in designer John Nillson saying of it, "Naval officers fall in love with [this] ship. It's not classically beautiful. In fact it looks like a lunchbox. But it has better maneuverability and can achieve that level of stealth."

Construction and career
Kockums delivered her to FMV on 24 April 2006, when she started her extensive operational sea trials, during which she has returned to the yard several times.  On 12 August 2006 she left Sweden for the Mediterranean. She returned to Karlskrona 11 September the same year.

References

External links

 BBC article
 FMV - Official homepage
 Kockums - Official homepage
 Swedish navy page 

Corvettes of Sweden
Visby-class corvettes
2003 ships
Ships built in Malmö